Jillyang is a town, or eup in Gyeongsan, North Gyeongsang Province, South Korea. The township Jillyang-myeon was upgraded to the town Jillyang-eup in 1997. Jillyang Town Office is located in Sinsang-ri, which is crowded with people.

Communities
Jillyang-eup is divided into 25 villages (ri).

References

External links
Official website 

Gyeongsan
Towns and townships in North Gyeongsang Province